George Villiers, 1st Duke of Buckingham,  (28 August 1592 – 23 August 1628), was an English courtier, statesman, and patron of the arts. He was a favourite of King James I of England. Buckingham remained at the height of royal favour for the first three years of the reign of James's son, King Charles I, until a disgruntled army officer assassinated him.

Early life 

Villiers was born in Brooksby, Leicestershire, on 28 August 1592, the son of the minor gentleman Sir George Villiers (1550–1606). His mother, Mary (1570–1632), daughter of Anthony Beaumont of Glenfield, Leicestershire, was widowed early. She educated her son for a courtier's life and sent him to travel in France with John Eliot.

Villiers took to the training set by his mother: he could dance and fence well, spoke a little French, and overall became an excellent student. Godfrey Goodman (Bishop of Gloucester from 1624 to 1655) declared Villiers "the handsomest-bodied man in all of England; his limbs so well compacted, and his conversation so pleasing, and of so sweet a disposition".

Ascent at court 

In August 1614, at age twenty-one, Villiers caught the eye of King James I at a hunt in Apethorpe. Opponents of the king's favourite Robert Carr, Earl of Somerset, saw an opportunity to displace Somerset and began promoting Villiers. Money was raised to purchase Villiers a new wardrobe, and intense lobbying secured his appointment as Royal Cup-bearer, a position that allowed him to make conversation with the king. Villiers began to appear as a dancer in masques from 1615, in which he could exhibit his grace of movement and beauty of body, a recognised avenue to royal favour since the time of Elizabeth I.

Under the king's patronage, Villiers advanced rapidly through the ranks of the nobility, and his court appointments grew in importance. In 1615 he was knighted as a Gentleman of the Bedchamber. In 1616, when he became the King's Master of the Horse, he was elevated to the peerage as Baron Whaddon, Viscount Villiers, and made a Knight of the Garter. The next year he was made Earl and in 1618 promoted Marquess of Buckingham, then finally in 1623 Duke of Buckingham. Villiers' new rank allowed him to dance side by side with the royal heir Charles I, with whom his friendship developed through his tutoring of the prince in dance.

Villiers was appointed Lord High Admiral of England in 1619, and in 1623 the former dukedom of Buckingham was recreated for him when he was negotiating abroad on the king's behalf. Since the dukedom of Norfolk had lapsed in 1572 with the attainder and execution of Thomas Howard, 4th Duke of Norfolk, Buckingham now became the only English duke who, at the time, was not a member of the royal family (James's two sons were Duke of Cornwall and Duke of York).

Relationship with James I 

Villiers was the last in a succession of handsome young favourites on whom the king lavished affection and patronage. The extent to which the relationship between the two was sexual has been much discussed. James's nickname for Buckingham was "Steenie", after St. Stephen who was said to have had "the face of an angel". Speaking to the Privy Council in 1617, James tried to clarify the situation:
 Historian David M. Bergeron claims "Buckingham became James's last and greatest lover" citing flowery letters that followed 17th-century styles of masculinity. Other scholars say there was no sexual relationship between the two, and note that the king's many enemies never accused him of sodomy. In a letter to Buckingham in 1623, the King ended with the salutation, "God bless you, my sweet child and wife, and grant that ye may ever be a comfort to your dear father and husband". Buckingham reciprocated the King's affections, writing back to James: "I naturally so love your person, and adore all your other parts, which are more than ever one man had", "I desire only to live in the world for your sake" and "I will live and die a lover of you". Buckingham himself provides ambiguous evidence, writing to James many years later that he had pondered "whether you loved me now...better than at the time which I shall never forget at Farnham, where the bed's head could not be found between the master and his dog".

Speculation about the close relationship between king and favourite was not confined to Great Britain. It was carried back to France by the poet Théophile de Viau, who was resident in England in 1621 and had then addressed to Buckingham the flattering ode Au marquis du Boukinquan. On his return, he went on to justify his own masculine preferences by a witty appeal both to Classical mythology and to the contemporary gossip:
Apollo with his songs 
Debauched young Hyacinth 
... 
And that learned English king, 
Wasn't Buckingham his fuck?

Influence under James I 
Until James I died in 1625, Buckingham was the king's constant companion and closest advisor, enjoying control of all royal patronage. Buckingham used his influence to prodigiously enrich his relatives and advance their social positions, which soured public opinion towards him.

In his rise to power, Buckingham became connected with the philosopher and jurist Francis Bacon. Bacon wrote letters of advice to the young favourite and drafted the patent of nobility when Buckingham ascended to the peerage. With Buckingham's support, Bacon was appointed Lord Chancellor in 1618. In gratitude, Bacon honoured Buckingham's many requests for favours from the court for friends and allies. Following an investigation by Parliament into royal grants of monopoly, financial speculation and corrupt officials, Bacon was convicted of corruption and forced into retirement. Neither Buckingham nor the King attempted to intervene on Bacon's behalf. Many of Buckingham's contemporaries believed he had sacrificed Bacon to save himself from Parliamentary scrutiny, as he had been liberally spending public funds and accepting gifts and bribes.

From 1616, Buckingham also established a dominant influence in Irish affairs, beginning with the appointment of his client, Sir Oliver St John, as Lord Deputy, 1616–22. Thence, he acquired control of the Irish customs farm (1618), dominated Irish patronage at court, particularly with the sale of Irish titles and honours, and (from 1618) began to build substantial Irish estates for himself, his family and clients—with the aid of a plantation lobby, composed of official clients in Dublin. To the same end, he secured the creation of an Irish Court of Wards in 1622. Buckingham's influence thus crucially sustained an aggressive Irish plantation policy into the 1620s.

When Parliament began its investigation into monopolies and other abuses in England, and later Ireland in 1621, Buckingham made a show of support to avoid action being taken against him. However, the king's decision to send a commission of inquiry to Ireland, which included parliamentary firebrands, threatened to expose Buckingham's growing, often clandestine, interests there. Knowing that the king had assured the Spanish ambassador that the Parliament would not be allowed to imperil a Spanish matrimonial alliance, he therefore surreptitiously instigated a conflict between the Parliament and the king over the Spanish Match, which resulted in the Parliament's premature dissolution in December 1621 and a hobbling of the Irish commission in 1622. Irish reforms introduced in 1623–24 by Lionel Cranfield, Earl of Middlesex and Lord Treasurer, were largely nullified by Middlesex's impeachment and disgrace in the violently anti-Spanish 1624 parliament—spurred on by Buckingham and Prince Charles.

Charles I, the Lord Admiral and foreign affairs 

In 1623 Buckingham, now Lord Admiral and effective Foreign Minister, accompanied Charles I, then Prince of Wales, to Spain for marriage negotiations regarding the Infanta Maria. The negotiations had long been stuck, but it is believed that Buckingham's crassness was key to the total collapse of the agreement, and they returned in a black mood. The Spanish ambassador asked Parliament to have Buckingham executed for his behaviour in Madrid, but Buckingham gained popularity by calling for war with Spain on his return.

He headed further marriage negotiations, but when, in December 1624, the betrothal to Henrietta Maria of France was announced, the choice of a Catholic was widely condemned. Buckingham, whose popularity had suffered a further setback, took a decision to help the rebellious Huguenot Admiral Benjamin, Duke of Soubise. An ardent Protestant, Buckingham ordered Sir John Penington to help; but the Navy only succeeded in attacking Richelieu's enemies, defeating his objects in August 1625 and losing La Rochelle. Similarly he was blamed for the failure of the military expedition under the command of Ernst von Mansfeld, a famous German mercenary general, sent to the continent to recover the Electorate of the Palatinate (1625), which had belonged to Frederick V, Elector Palatine, son-in-law of King James I of England. However, when the Duke of York became King Charles I, Buckingham was the only man from the court of James to maintain his position.

These failures provoked the Commons to refuse further levies of taxation to fund Buckingham's extravagant adventures, while at the same time the duke was accused of being enraptured by intrigues; of dealing a blow to the international Catholic conspiracy. Yet even before they set sail the food was consumed awaiting the Board of Ordnance to deliver the cannonry and musket balls. On this occasion, the Lord Admiral was not in command. The experienced admirals were unavailable, so it fell to the newly created Viscount Wimbledon to lead the expedition with one eye on history; to repeat the actions of Sir Francis Drake by seizing the main Spanish port at Cádiz and burning the fleet in its harbour.

Although this plan was tactically sound—landing further up the coast and marching the militia army on the city—the troops were badly equipped, ill-disciplined and poorly trained. Coming upon a warehouse filled with wine, they simply got drunk, and the attack was called off. The English army briefly occupied a small port further down the coast before re-boarding its ships. Pennington's curse was a lack of money, but public opinion blamed Buckingham for another disaster. The King too was hurting; England was heading towards war with France.

This was followed by Buckingham leading the Army and the Navy to sea to intercept an anticipated Spanish silver fleet from its American territories. However, the Spanish were forewarned by their intelligence and easily avoided the planned ambush. With supplies running out and men sick and dying from starvation and disease, the English limped home in embarrassment.

Buckingham then negotiated with the French Chief Minister, Cardinal Richelieu, for English ships to aid Richelieu in his fight against the French Protestant Huguenots, in return for French aid against the Spanish occupying the Palatinate. Seven English warships participated in operations against La Rochelle and in the siege of Saint-Martin-de-Ré, but Parliament was disgusted and horrified at the thought of English Protestants fighting French Protestants. The plan only fuelled their fears of crypto-Catholicism at court. Buckingham fought bravely throughout, but Richelieu's ships blocked the narrow channel, and he had to accept defeat by withdrawal. Believing that the failure of his enterprise was the result of treachery, he formulated an alliance among the churchman's many enemies, a policy that included support for the very Huguenots whom he had recently attacked.

In 1627, Buckingham led another expeditionary force. Shortly before departure, Buckingham had authorized a new dry dock at Portsmouth to bring Navy Administration up to date; yet it was never built. The Lord Admiral was already bankrupt when he attempted to aid his new Huguenot allies besieged at La Rochelle in France, by leading the renewed siege of Saint-Martin-de-Ré. He funded the force with Sir William Russell raising £70,000 between them, responsible for the officers out of their own pockets in addition to the victuals. Unpaid for 10 months they looted the King's stores: during the campaign they lost more than 4,000 of a force of 7,000 men. The Admiral Earl of Denbigh was tentative in his attacks on a large French fleet. On 18 September the Earl of Lindsey arrived with fireships but they did not prove decisive.

Assassination 

During the course of the duke's incompetent leadership, Parliament had twice attempted to impeach him. The king had rescued him by dissolving Parliament both times, but public feeling was so inflamed as a result that the duke was widely blamed as a public enemy. Eventually, his physician, Dr. Lambe, popularly supposed to assert a diabolic influence over him, was mobbed in the streets and died as a result. Among the pamphlets issued afterwards was one that prophesied

The duke was stabbed to death, on 23 August 1628, at the Greyhound Inn in Portsmouth, where he had gone to organise yet another campaign. According to the eyewitness account sent by Dudley Carleton, 1st Viscount Dorchester to the queen, "he turned about, uttering only this word, villaine! and never spoke more: but presently, plucking out the knife from himself, before he fell to the ground, he made towards the traitor two or three paces, and then fell against a table." The assassin was John Felton, an army officer who had been wounded in the earlier military adventure and believed he had been passed over for promotion by Buckingham.

Such was the duke's unpopularity by this time that Felton was widely acclaimed as a hero by the public. A large number of poems celebrating Felton and justifying his action were published. Copies of written statements Felton carried in his hat during the assassination were also widely circulated. Many of these described Buckingham as effeminate, cowardly and corrupt, and contrasted him with Felton, who was held up as an example of manliness, courage and virtue. The son of Alexander Gill the Elder was sentenced to a fine of £2000 and the removal of his ears, after being overheard drinking to the health of Felton, and stating that Buckingham had joined King James I in hell. However, these punishments were remitted after his father and Archbishop Laud appealed to King Charles I. Felton was hanged on 29 November and his body was taken to Portsmouth for public display. However, this proved to be a miscalculation by the authorities as it became an object of veneration by the public.

Buckingham was buried in Westminster Abbey. His lavish tomb bears a Latin inscription that may be translated as "The Enigma of the World". Here, too, he was depicted surrounded by mythical figures. The black marble sculptures at each corner include Mars and Neptune, in reference to his military and naval exploits; on the catafalque lie bronze-gilt effigies of the duke and his wife (who long survived him), cast by Hubert Le Sueur."Historical Memorials of Westminster Abbey" Stanley, A.P. p197: London; John Murray; 1882 Buckingham is clad in armour, enriched with crossed anchors and with an ermine cloak over it. He wears on his breast the chain and George of the Garter and on his head a ducal coronet, summing up the principal steps in his brief career. He had died at the age of 35.

Self-promotion through the arts
As a means of manoeuvring for political as well as court advancement, Villiers commissioned masques in which he was able to promote himself in a leading role. By appearing there as a dancer himself his grace of movement and beauty of body was put on show. By 1618 his elevation in rank allowed him to dance side by side with the royal heir, with whom his friendship developed through his tutoring of the prince in dance. "Command over his body had provided him with the privilege of commanding the moves of a future king". This culminated in connivance by his supporters in licensing Thomas Middleton's notorious play A Game at Chess (1624) as an extension of their anti-Spanish foreign policy. The duke and Prince Charles are acknowledged as figuring there as The White Duke and The White Knight, while very obvious depictions of the Spanish monarch and his former ambassador in England eventually brought about the play's closure.

Villiers also commissioned portraits of himself as "a medium for the cultivation of his personal image". William Larkin's portrait of 1616 records the start of his climb, showing him in the dress of a Knight of the Garter and emphasising the felicity of his stance and sumptuousness of dress. A 1619 portrait by Daniel Mytens the Elder is equally elegant. There he is dressed in white brocade and white silk hose, wearing the Garter and standing in a decor of costly silks. Another full-length portrait by the same artist celebrates his succession as Lord High Admiral in 1619. Here he wears three-quarter armour; on the right, behind a balustrade, is a shoreline with the fleet beyond. Buckingham's growing wealth was emphasised by the detail of his clothes. This is evident in the lovingly depicted lace about his collar and cuffs in the full-length portrait by Cornelis Janssens van Ceulen. and the head and shoulders by Anthony van Dyck. The 1625 painting by Michiel van Miereveld is not only of unparalleled magnificence, with a jacket encrusted with pearls which also hang in ropes across it, but may also contain a reference to his diplomatic coup that year in negotiating the marriage of the future Charles I. At his entry to the French Court, he is recorded as wearing a grey velvet suit from which the loosely threaded pearls dropped to the ground as he advanced to make his bow to the queen, to the general wonder.

A series of more theatrical depictions heighten Buckingham's self-dramatisation and in certain cases make policy statements as well. Two of these are connected with his betrothal to and marriage with Lady Katherine Manners in 1620. In Van Dyck's historical painting The Continence of Scipio, Buckingham is clearly recognisable standing at the centre, receiving from Scipio the hand of his captured betrothed. A mythical composition commissioned from Van Dyck later commemorates the actual marriage. In contrast to the former painting, this was highly unconventional at the time. The couple are pictured all but naked as Venus and Adonis, emphasising heterosexual love and so countering all the rumours of the duke's relations with the king. There is a further literary connection since the story is found in Ovid, but the picture again defies convention by hinting at a different, happier ending.

Buckingham probably met Peter Paul Rubens while conducting the royal marriage negotiations in Paris in 1625 and commissioned two ambitious advertisements of his standing from the painter. The first of these was destined for the ceiling of his York House residence and depicts a masque-like theme in which Minerva and Mercury conduct the Duke of Buckingham to the Temple of Virtue (also known as The Apotheosis of the Duke of Buckingham and The Duke of Buckingham Triumphing over Envy and Anger). In front of the marble temple to which he is carried upwards are the probable figures of Virtue and Abundance; the three Graces offer the duke a crown of flowers, while Envy seeks to pull him down and a lion challenges him. The picture is an allegory of Buckingham's political aspirations and the forces that he saw as impeding him. Though the painting was destroyed in a fire in 1949, it was survived by a preparatory sketch now held in the National Gallery in London and by a copy made by William Etty. Yet another Rubens portrait was rediscovered in 2017, when the painter's preparatory portrait of Buckingham was identified at Pollok House in Scotland.

Rubens' other major commission, Equestrian Portrait of the Duke of Buckingham (1625) is accounted "the finest state portrait of its date in England". The original was destroyed in a fire at the Le Gallais depository in St Helier, Jersey, on 30 September 1949, but a sketch by Rubens is now in the Kimbell Art Museum. A summation of his career to date, it depicts Buckingham as Lord High Admiral of the fleet that is just visible in the background. Several other personal references are also incorporated. As Master of the King's Horses, he sits on a Spanish jennet (a breed he introduced to Britain), lifting a baton as his horse rears on command. Beneath him, the sea god Neptune and a naiad adorned with pearls indicate the duke's dominion over the sea. Overhead, a winged allegory of Fame signals victory (which nevertheless evaded the commander in real life) with trumpet in hand. Privately Rubens noted Buckingham's "arrogance and caprice" and predicted that he was "heading for the precipice".

Popular prints, often drawing on his painted portraits, particularly Miervelt's of 1625, had served to advertise Buckingham's position more broadly over the years. These now form part of the collection at the National Portrait Gallery. At the same time martial statements were being made through this medium in support of Buckingham's foreign policy, as for instance in Willem de Passe's equestrian portrait of the duke, executed at the same time as Rubens was engaged on his monumental work on the same theme. There he is similarly depicted as Lord Admiral with a military baton in his right hand. During the 1627 expedition that he led personally, Buckingham was recorded as sponsoring "an unprecedented campaign of intensive print propaganda".

In 1628, during the political turmoil that culminated in his assassination, Buckingham commissioned another masque-like painting from Gerrit van Honthorst, The Liberal Arts presented to King Charles and Henrietta Maria. In this the duke is cast as Mercury, the patron of the arts, the procession of whom is brought in his train to the presence of the king and queen in the guise of Apollo and Diana. In this validation of his artistic credentials, it is appropriate to remember that Buckingham had taken part in the masque Mercury Vindicated at the start of his career in 1615.

Marriage and children 

Buckingham married the daughter of the 6th Earl of Rutland, Lady Katherine Manners, later suo jure Baroness de Ros, on 16 May 1620, against her father's objections. The children of this marriage were:
 Mary Villiers (before 30 March 1622 – November 1685), married firstly Charles Herbert, Lord Herbert, secondly James Stewart, 1st Duke of Richmond and thirdly Colonel Thomas Howard.
 Charles Villiers, Earl of Coventry (17 November 1625 – 16 March 1627), died in infancy.
 George Villiers, 2nd Duke of Buckingham (30 January 1628 – 16 April 1687).
 Lord Francis Villiers (bef. 21 April 1629 – 7 July 1648), died in a skirmish at Kingston during the Second English Civil War.

Legacy 

During the duke's short tenure as Chancellor of the University of Cambridge, he had initiated the purchase of Thomas van Erpe's collection of oriental books and manuscripts on its behalf, although his widow only transferred it to Cambridge University Library after his death. With it came the first book in Chinese to be added to the Library's collections.

After Buckingham's assassination, a large amount of satirical verse was circulated on the subject. Most of this reflected on how pride goes before a fall and the damage he had done to the kingdom, while several pieces commended John Felton's action. The dagger, claimed to have been used by him, was recorded by a late Victorian gazetteer as still on display at the now demolished Newnham Paddox in Warwickshire. This was the seat of the Earls of Denbigh, whose first earl married Buckingham's sister Susan.

The duke's residence of York House occupied what eventually became the Adelphi district in London. When his son sold the area to developers, it was on condition that his father and titles were commemorated in naming the new streets. These were, accordingly, George Court, Villiers Street, Duke Street, Of Alley and Buckingham Street.

Fictional appearances
A fictionalised Buckingham is one of the characters in Alexandre Dumas's celebrated 1844 novel Les Trois Mousquetaires (The Three Musketeers), which paints him as in love with Anne of Austria as well as dealing with the siege of La Rochelle and his assassination by Felton. He is described:

In the 1973 two-film, Anglo-American adaptation of the book—The Three Musketeers and The Four Musketeers—Buckingham also has a prominent role as an ally of the main characters. The second film includes his assassination by Felton, but (following the original novel in this) depicts the killing as being orchestrated by the fictional Milady de Winter, an agent of the principal villain, Cardinal Richelieu.

Taylor Caldwell's The Arm and the Darkness (1943) also deals with this period in France, while Hilda Lewis' Wife to Great Buckingham (1959) goes so far as to make Buckingham's love for the French queen the main cause of his undoing. The duke also figures in historical romances like Evelyn Anthony's Charles, The King (1963) and Bertrice Small's Darling Jasmine (2007), although the main focus there is on other protagonists. The Spanish Match and Buckingham's part in it is made an episode in Spanish author Arturo Pérez-Reverte's novel "El Capitán Alatriste" (1996). There he and the then Prince of Wales are the subjects of an assassination attempt by Spanish plotters.

In Philippa Gregory's Earthly Joys (1998), which has as its subject the famous gardener John Tradescant the Elder, the bewitching Duke appears halfway through the novel as the object of Tradescant's love. Another historical fiction, Ronald Blythe's The Assassin (2004), is written from his killer's point of view as a final confession while awaiting execution in the Tower of London.

David Mark's Anatomy of a Heretic (2022) begins with the unhistorical premise that Buckingham orders a revenge assassination in the Dutch East Indies.

Notes

References

Further reading
 Coast, David. "Rumor and 'Common Fame': The Impeachment of the Duke of Buckingham and Public Opinion in Early Stuart England." Journal of British Studies 55.2 (2016): 241–267. online
 Hanrahan, David C. Charles II and the Duke of Buckingham (The History Press, 2006).

 MacIntyre, Jean. "Buckingham the Masquer." Renaissance and Reformation/Renaissance et Réforme (1998): 59–81. online, Covers his skill at dancing.
 
 Parry, Mark. "The Bishops and the Duke of Buckingham, 1624–1626." History 100.343 (2015): 640–666.

External links 

 
 
 The impeachment of Buckingham (1626), Historical Collections of Private Passages of State: Volume 1: 1618–29 (1721), pp. 302–358.

|-

|-

|-

1592 births
1628 deaths
People from the Borough of Melton
British and English royal favourites
Peers of England created by James I
Lord High Admirals of England
Lord High Constables of England
Chancellors of the University of Cambridge
Diplomatic peers
Knights Bachelor
Knights of the Garter
Lord-Lieutenants of Buckinghamshire
Lord-Lieutenants of Kent
Lord-Lieutenants of Middlesex
Lords Warden of the Cinque Ports
George Villiers, 1st Duke of Buckingham
People murdered in England
English murder victims
Male murder victims
Assassinated nobility
Burials at Westminster Abbey
Deaths by stabbing in England
17th-century English nobility
Ambassadors of England to the Netherlands
English people of the Thirty Years' War
Crime in Hampshire
Assassinated English politicians
Earls of Buckingham
1
Younger sons of earls
English art patrons
17th-century philanthropists
English LGBT people
Murder in 1628